Jörn Rausing (born 12 February 1960) is a Swedish heir and businessman, a co-owner of Tetra Laval, the packaging company.

In 2021, the Sunday Times Rich List estimated his joint net worth with Kirsten Rausing at £13 billion.

Early life
Jörn Rausing is the son of Gad Rausing and Birgit Rausing.

Career
As well as Tetra Laval, he owns a share of Ocado, where he is a board director. In 2003, Rausing made a £26.5 million investment in Ocado, with his stake now being worth £1.4 billion.

Rausing, along with his sister Kirsten Rausing and his brother Finn Rausing, hold a 20% stake in International Flavors & Fragrances, which sells scents used in fizzy drinks, perfumes and other consumer products.

Personal life
Rausing lives in Surrey, England.

References 

1960 births
Living people
Swedish businesspeople
Swedish billionaires
Jorn